Kevin Folk (born July 26, 1980 in Saskatoon, Saskatchewan) is a Canadian curler from Kelowna, British Columbia. He previously played third for Jim Cotter.

Career
Folk won the 2000 Canadian Junior Curling Championships playing third for Brad Kuhn. The team then went on to win the 2000 World Junior Curling Championships.

After juniors, Folk joined with his father, two-time Brier and World Champion, Rick Folk's team. He left the team in 2005 to join up with Bob Ursel. Folk qualified for his first Brier in 2008 with Ursel, and the team finished in fourth place, losing the 3–4 game to Glenn Howard of Ontario. Cotter took over the reins as skip of the rink in 2011.

Folk left the team after the 2011–12 season, when he took a job in Calgary.

Personal life
As of 2012, Folk is a senior account manager at RBC Royal Bank. He studied at Okanagan University College.

Folk's parents are former Canadian Mixed champions. Folk's father, Rick Folk, is a two-time Brier and World champion and a former politician, holding a seat in the Legislative Assembly of Saskatchewan.

Teams

References

External links
 

1980 births
Curlers from Saskatoon
Curlers from British Columbia
Sportspeople from Kelowna
Living people
Canada Cup (curling) participants